The 2006–07 St. Francis Terriers men's basketball team represented St. Francis College during the 2006–07 NCAA Division I men's basketball season. The team was coached by Brian Nash, who was in his second year at the helm of the St. Francis Terriers. The Terrier's home games were played at the  Generoso Pope Athletic Complex. The team has been a member of the Northeast Conference since 1981.

Nash's team finished at 9–22 overall and 7–11 in conference play for an 8th-place finish.

Roster

Schedule and results

|-
!colspan=12 style="background:#0038A8; border: 2px solid #CE1126;;color:#FFFFFF;"| Regular season

    

  

|-
!colspan=12 style="background:#0038A8; border: 2px solid #CE1126;;color:#FFFFFF;"| 2007 NEC tournament

References

St. Francis Brooklyn Terriers men's basketball seasons
St. Francis
2006 in sports in New York City
2007 in sports in New York City